Boyne Resorts is an owner and operator of ski and golf resorts in the United States. The company employs over 7,000 full-time and seasonal staff.  It operates 13 resort properties: 10 ski resorts and 11 golf courses.  The company, based in Boyne Falls, Michigan, owns and/or operates properties in the U.S. states of Michigan, Montana, Washington, Maine, New Hampshire, Tennessee, and Utah, and the Canadian province of British Columbia.

History 
Boyne Resorts was founded by Everett Kircher, Jim Christianson and John Norton in 1947. They purchased a steep hill in Northern Michigan for $1 from former State Senator Pierson. Then the co-founders bought a single chairlift from Sun Valley in Idaho and installed it at their Northern Michigan resort as its first lift.  This chairlift was the first ever built and is still in service today, it has been upgraded several times. In 1954, Boyne built and opened the Gatlinburg Skylift in Tennessee as a summer tourist attraction. In 1963, Boyne Highlands in Northern Michigan was added and by 1967, Boyne Mountain expanded to include additional lifts and a golf course.  Robert Trent Jones designed the first resort course in the region at Boyne Highlands in 1966.

After Boyne passed opportunities to acquire Telluride Ski Resort in Colorado and Jackson Hole Mountain Resort in Wyoming, they closed a deal to purchase Chet Huntley's Big Sky Resort in 1976, only a few years after its opening in December 1973, and now is the second-largest ski resort in the United States by acreage. In 1986, Boyne purchased Brighton outside of Salt Lake City, Utah. In the 1990s, Boyne USA purchased golf courses in Michigan and Florida. 1997 brought along the company's fifth ski resort, Crystal Mountain, Washington.

In 2001, Boyne added its first Canadian resort, Cypress Mountain outside Vancouver, British Columbia. Cypress Mountain was the host to all the Freestyle and Snowboard events for the 2010 Winter Olympic Games. In 2002, the company's founder and visionary, Everett Kircher died; his children maintained Boyne as a privately held company (Kircher had transferred ownership of the company to his children in 1976).  John Kircher oversees the Brighton and Crystal Mountain operations. Stephen Kircher oversees the Eastern and Midwest operations as well as Western operations at Big Sky Resort, Cypress Mountain and The Summit at Snoqualmie. Amy Kircher is the Chairperson of the board. In 2007, Boyne Resorts entered into a sale and leaseback arrangement with CNL Income Properties on the Gatlinburg Skilift, Brighton and Cypress Mountain. The leases run for at least 40 years to Boyne for operations and all have buy back provisions to Boyne Resorts. Later in 2007, Boyne purchased Sunday River and Sugarloaf in Maine from The American Skiing Company and entered into a sale and leaseback arrangement with CNL Income Properties with similar 40 year leases.

On September 19, 2007, Boyne announced their purchase of CNL Income Properties leases for The Summit at Snoqualmie, Washington, and Loon Mountain, New Hampshire, from Booth Creek Resorts. This purchase made Boyne the largest family owned ski resort operator in North America in terms of number of resorts, and second in number of skier visits at almost 3.6 million visitors.

Boyne Resorts also holds or held numerous patents on snowmaking technologies and has unveiled its latest technology in the Boyne Low E Fan Gun throughout its eastern resorts.

In 2016, CNL Income Properties sold all six of the ski resorts they leased to Boyne to Och-Ziff Capital Management. On March 31, 2017, John Kircher, 20-year CEO of Boyne and son of co-founder, acquired Crystal Mountain by trading it with his shares in the company. In March 2018, Boyne Resorts purchased Sunday River, Sugarloaf, The Summit at Snoqualmie, Loon Mountain, Brighton, and Cypress Mountain Ski Area from Och-Ziff Capital Management after years of leasing the properties.

Properties

Ski Resorts
Boyne currently owns and operates 10 ski resorts in 6 U.S. states and 1 Canadian province.

Other Properties

Retail stores 
Boyne Resorts owns Boyne Country Sports, a sporting goods store chain with seven locations across Michigan.

References

External links
 Boyne Resorts - Official site
 Boyne USA Resorts - NewEnglandSkiHistory.com

Resorts in Michigan
Companies based in Michigan
Tourist attractions in Charlevoix County, Michigan
Skiing organizations